Tartaras is a commune in the Loire department in central France.

Geography
It is in the Gier valley just north of the river, between Rive-de-Gier to the west and Saint-Romain-en-Gier to the east.

History
The village dates back to the Roman era. Gallo-Roman sarcophagi are still visible in the town. During the 19th century Tartaras was in the heart of a coal basin.

Population

Sights
The  maison familiale rurale de Tartaras (Tartarus rural family home) is an institution recognized by the Ministry of Agriculture that offers training schemes in the 4th of the professional baccalaureate: horticulture and landscape works.

The Givors canal, built in 1761–81, passed by the village. The tunnel and double lock at its entrance have been preserved as a monument, although the canal has mostly been filled in.

Personalities
Charles Bossut (1730-1814), mathematician, was born in Tartarus.

References
Citations

Sources

Communes of Loire (department)